Promontorium Sacrum or Sacrum Promontorium (Latin for "Holy Promontory") may refer to:
Cap Corse, in France
Cape St. Vincent, in Portugal
Carnsore Point, in Ireland
Crimea, in Ukraine
Kilidonia, in Turkey
Sagres Point, in Portugal

See also
Sacrum#Promontory, part of the human body
Sacred promontory, other promontories considered sacred